Extreme Cheapskates is an American reality television series that aired on TLC and premiered on October 16, 2012. It documents the lives of those who take frugality to an extreme. TLC aired the series' pilot episode in December 2011, and ordered a six episode first season on February 23, 2012. Season 2 premiered on October 30, 2013.

Episodes

Pilot

Season 1 (2012)

Season 2 (2013)

Season 3 (2014)

Reception
Allison Keene of The Hollywood Reporter said fans of Hoarders won't be disappointed by the show. Melissa Camacho of Common Sense Media gave the show 2 out of 5 stars.

See also
 Miser

References

External links
 
 

2010s American reality television series
2012 American television series debuts
English-language television shows
TLC (TV network) original programming
2014 American television series endings